This article summarises the events, album releases, and album release dates in hip hop music for the year 1995.

Released albums

Highest-charting singles

Highest first-week sales

See also

Last article: 1994 in hip hop music
Next article: 1996 in hip hop music

References

Hip hop
Hip hop music by year